Parazosmotes deceptor is a species of beetle in the family Cerambycidae. It was described by Holzschuh in 2009.

References

Pteropliini
Beetles described in 2009